Bugambilia (Bougainvillea) is a 1945 Mexican film directed by Emilio Fernández and starring Dolores del Río and Pedro Armendáriz.

Plot 
In the Mexican city of Guanajuato, in the 1800s, the young and beautiful Amalia de los Robles (Dolores del Río) wakes up the passion of all the men of the region. This provokes the fury of her widowed father, Don Fernando (Julio Villarreal) who sees in her the face of his dead wife. But Amalia  falls in love with the smart Ricardo (Pedro Armendáriz). Tragic circumstances, however, prevent them from being united.

Cast

 Dolores del Río .... Amalia de los Robles
 Pedro Armendáriz .... Ricardo Rojas
 Julio Villarreal .... Don Fernando de los Robles
 Alberto Galán .... Luis Felipe
 Stella Inda .... Zarca
 Arturo Soto Rangel .... Cura
 Concha Sanza .... Nana Nicanora
 Roberto Cañedo .... Alberto, el poeta
 Jose Elías Moreno .... Socio de Ricardo
 Maruja Griffel .... Matilde, la chismosa

References

External links 

1945 films
Mexican black-and-white films
1940s Spanish-language films
Films directed by Emilio Fernández
Mexican romantic drama films
1945 romantic drama films
1940s Mexican films